I Had the Blues But I Shook Them Loose is the first album by the London indie rock band, Bombay Bicycle Club released on 3 July 2009. The band announced the title through MySpace and their official website on 31 March 2009. The album was recorded during October and November 2008, with the long-term producer Jim Abbiss. The title comes from a line in the song "After Hours" by A Tribe Called Quest, from their 1990 album People's Instinctive Travels and the Paths of Rhythm.

Reception

I Had the Blues... received a generally positive reception from critics. The review aggregator Metacritic gave the album a normalised rating of 60, indicating "Mixed or average reviews". However, most if not all professional scores indicate the album was warmly received altogether.

Track listing

References

2009 debut albums
Bombay Bicycle Club albums
Island Records albums
Albums produced by Jim Abbiss